The 34rd European Men's Artistic Gymnastics Championships were held from 9 to 13 December 2020 at the Mersin Gymnastics Hall in Mersin, Turkey. The competition was originally scheduled to be held from 27 to 31 May 2020 in Baku, Azerbaijan, but it was rescheduled due to the COVID-19 pandemic. The Baku event was rescheduled for 9 to 13 December, before the event was relocated to Mersin. Originally an Olympic qualifying event, the competition was undesignated as such in light of the ongoing pandemic, so as to avoid pressuring member federations to attend if they were not willing to do so.

Only 20 nations opted to send athletes, as the majority of countries withdrew out of concerns regarding the COVID-19 pandemic in Europe. European Gymnastics barred the Polish Gymnastics Federation from sending any athletes due to outstanding financial obligations resulting from their hosting the 2019 edition of the event.

Competition schedule 
The schedule of Championships:

Medals summary

Medalists

Medal standings

Overall

Senior

Junior

Senior results

Team competition 
Only six teams advanced to the team final rather than the traditional eight.

Oldest and youngest competitors

Floor 
Turkey's Abdelrahman Elgamal sustained an injury prior to the team final and was replaced by first alternate Alexander Benda of Austria.

Oldest and youngest competitors

Pommel horse 
Matvei Petrov won Albania's first-ever medal at the European Championships.

Oldest and youngest competitors

Rings 
Oldest and youngest competitors

Vault 
Oldest and youngest competitors

Parallel bars 
Oldest and youngest competitors

Horizontal bar 
Oldest and youngest competitors

Junior results

Team competition

Individual all-around 
Fifth-place qualifier Gabriel Burtănete of Romania was replaced by teammate Raul Gabriel Șoica, who had previously been affected by the two-per-country rule.

Floor

Pommel horse

Rings

Vault

Parallel bars

Horizontal bar

Qualification results

Senior

Team competition 
Due to the smaller competition roster, the team final was reduced to six teams.

Floor

Pommel horse

Rings

Vault

Parallel bars

Horizontal bar

Junior

Individual all-around

Floor

Pommel horse

Rings

Vault

Parallel bars

Horizontal bar

References

External links 
 2020 European Championships in Men's Artistic Gymnastics

European Artistic Gymnastics Championships
European Men's
European Artistic Gymnastics Championships
European Artistic Gymnastics Championships (men)
Gymnastics competitions in Turkey
Sport in Mersin
European Men's